Meendum Parasakthi is a 1985 Indian Tamil-language film directed by A. Jagannathan, starring Sivakumar. It was released on 2 June 1985.

Plot

Cast 
 Sivakumar
 Nalini
 Jaishankar
 Goundamani
 Senthamarai
 Manorama

Soundtrack 
Soundtrack was composed by Ilaiyaraaja.

Reception
Jayamanmadhan of Kalki wrote looking for logic in cinema is a mistake, but is it like this? and concluded don't get mislead by the title.

References

External links 
 

1980s Tamil-language films
1985 films
Films directed by A. Jagannathan
Films scored by Ilaiyaraaja